Zodarion algarvense is a spider species found in Portugal.

See also
 List of Zodariidae species

References

External links

algarvense
Spiders of Europe
Spiders described in 1994